Rosnowo may refer to the following places:
Rosnowo, Greater Poland Voivodeship (west-central Poland)
Rosnowo, Gryfino County in West Pomeranian Voivodeship (north-west Poland)
Rosnowo, Koszalin County in West Pomeranian Voivodeship (north-west Poland)